Snehithan is an Indian Malayalam-language romantic comedy film directed by Jose Thomas starring Kunchacko Boban, Nandana, Krishna and Preetha Vijayakumar. It was the last film of N. F. Varghese.

Plot 
The story begins in a register office where Malavika waits for her lover Anand to come and register their marriage. She is accompanied by photographer Joji to cover the function. But when Anand does not turn up Malavika is forced to go with Joji. Taking sympathy on her, Joji helps her to get a hotel room, which leads to more trouble for them. Cops arrest them during a raid in the hotel and Joji's girlfriend Anu learns of this. To make things worse Joji lies to the police that Malavka is his wife and they are let free. Malavika's parents learn of their daughter's secret marriage and take the couple home, creating another twist in the tale.

Cast 
 Kunchacko Boban as Joji / Anandan Namboodiri
 Nandana as Malavika
 Krishna as Anand Xavier
 Preetha Vijayakumar as Ann Mary aka Anu
 N. F. Varghese as Padhmanabhan, Malavika's father
 Cochin Haneefa as SI Sudarshan
 Prem Kumar as Vivekan
 Sukumari as Malavika's grandmother
 Janardhanan as Vivekan's father
 Innocent as D.Devasia/Devaranyan Namboothiri, Joju's father
 Sreehari
 Indrans
 Valsala Menon
 Ambika Mohan as Malavika's mother
 Subair as Anu's father
 Deepika Mohan

Soundtrack 
The film's soundtrack contains eight songs, all composed by Mohan Sithara, with lyrics by Yusufali Kecheri.

References

External links 
 

2002 films
2000s Malayalam-language films
Films directed by Jose Thomas
Films scored by Mohan Sithara
Films shot in Thrissur